Meliton Varlamis dze Kantaria or Kantariya (5 October 1920 – 27 December 1993) was a Georgian sergeant of the Soviet Army credited with having hoisted a Soviet flag over the Reichstag on 30 April 1945, together with Mikhail Yegorov and Aleksey Berest.

Biography 
Born to a peasant family in a small Georgian town of Jvari, he worked in a kolkhoz until being mobilized in the Red Army in 1940. During World War II, he served in the 756th Rifle Regiment, 150th Rifle Division, of the 3rd Shock Army at the 1st Belorussian Front. He is credited for having mounted a red banner, together with Sergeant M.A. Yegorov, over the Reichstag on 1 May 1945.

Post-war 

Demobilized in 1946, he lived thereafter in Sukhumi working as a governmental shop manager. He joined the Communist Party of the Soviet Union in 1947. He lived in the city of Ochamchire, and later became a deputy of the Supreme Soviet of the Georgian SSR. In 1965, together with Yegorov and Konstantin Samsonov, he carried the Victory Banner at the Moscow Victory Day Parade on Red Square. In the same formation, they carried the banner at the International Workers' Day demonstration in 1970. A year after the secessionist war in Abkhazia started, during which Kantaria's house in Ochamchira was destroyed, he moved with his family to Moscow, where he later died two months later in December 1993 in a Moscow hospital. In early January 1994, Kantaria was reburied in his native town Jvari, on the grounds of School #3.

Legacy 
In 2010 on Poklonnaya Hill, a memorial was opened dedicated to Yegorov and Kantaria. Modern day Georgia holds Kantaria in high historical regard, being one of few whose Soviet era legacy was rehabilitated. Since 2011, the school where he has been buried has been named after Kantaria. It was renamed by President of Georgia Mikhail Saakashvili during that year's Victory Day celebrations, during which he noted that Kantaria "is probably the most classic example of the tragic fate of our people, since he ended his life as a refugee". A bust of Kantaria was unveiled installed in Tbilisi's Kikvidze Park at the initiative of the veteran organization "Heirs of Victory" in 2016.

Honours and awards
 Hero of the Soviet Union
 Order of Lenin
 Order of the Red Banner
 Order of the Patriotic War 1st class
 campaign and jubilee medals
He was an Honorary Citizen of Berlin from 8 May 1965 to 29 September 1992.

See also 
Raising the Flag on Iwo Jima 
Mikhail Minin - according to later researches, the first flag raiser over the Reichstag

References

External links 
 More details about the Banner of Victory at http://www.crwflags.com
 Meliton Varlamovich Kantaria 

1920 births
1993 deaths
People from Samegrelo-Zemo Svaneti
Mingrelians
Military personnel from Georgia (country)
Heroes of the Soviet Union
People of World War II from Georgia (country)
Soviet military personnel of World War II
Battle of Berlin
People notable for being the subject of a specific photograph
Recipients of the Order of Lenin
Recipients of the Order of the Red Banner